Shirvani Gadzhikurbanovich Muradov (born 20 June 1985 in Dagestan) is a Russian wrestler, who has won a gold medal at the 2008 Summer Olympics and European champion 2007.

Shirvani is Lak heritage.

References 

The Official Website of the Beijing 2008 Olympic Games

1985 births
Living people
People from Dagestan
Laks (Caucasus)
Olympic wrestlers of Russia
Wrestlers at the 2008 Summer Olympics
Olympic gold medalists for Russia
Olympic medalists in wrestling
Medalists at the 2008 Summer Olympics
Russian male sport wrestlers
Sportspeople from Dagestan
20th-century Russian people
21st-century Russian people